Posthuset station was a former tram stop on the Oslo Tramway. It has since been replaced by Dronningens gate station.

Posthuset station was located between Jernbanetorget station in the east and Kongens gate station in the west. It is named after the old post office of central Oslo (now superseded by Postgirobygget), which was located at Prinsens gate 8.

References

Disused Oslo Tramway stations

Year of establishment missing 
Year of disestablishment missing